Countryside is a census-designated place in Loudoun County, Virginia, United States. The population as of the 2010 census was 10,072. It is bordered by the community of Cascades to the east and by Dulles Town Center to the south, across Route 7.

History 
Construction on homes began in 1981 and continued through 1991.

The majority of the homes in Countryside were built by Pulte Homes and are of the colonial architectural style. Most of the single-family homes have two stories and a basement. CountrySide Proprietary is the community's homeowners association.

Recreation and natural features 
The community contains an extensive network of paved paths that wind through the wooded neighborhoods. It also contains three swimming pools. A network of smaller hiking trails branch off the main trail and are used for hiking, mountain biking, nature-watching and jogging. Some of the trails were developed by Eagle Scouts, others gradually by hikers; still others pre-date Countryside itself.

Horsepen Run drains the community, flowing north into the Potomac River. Countryside Lake is also accessible within the community for fishing and light water recreation at users' risk.

Several parks and recreational facilities are accessible to the northern border of the community, including Horsepen Run Countryside Nature Preserve, Algonkian Regional Park (which features Algonkian Golf Course), Potomac Lake Sportsplex, and Volcano Island Waterpark. The Algonkian Regional Park boat ramp provides access to the Potomac River for water sports. Several playgrounds are also accessible within the community.

Schools 
Countryside students attend Countryside Elementary School, Algonkian Elementary School, Horizon Elementary School, River Bend Middle School, and Potomac Falls High School.

References

External links

Countryside Elementary School
Algonkian Elementary School
River Bend Middle School
Potomac Falls High School
CountrySide Proprietary website

Census-designated places in Loudoun County, Virginia